Dioscorea amazonum is a herbaceous vine in the genus Dioscorea which is native to Bolivia, Brazil, Colombia, French Guiana, Guyana, Panamá, Peru, Suriname, and Venezuela. Specimens have been collected from forested areas next to roads and rivers.

References 

amazonum
Plants described in 1842